Syllitus dubius is a species of beetle in the family Cerambycidae. It was described by McKeown in 1938.

References

Stenoderini
Beetles described in 1938